Dad's Weird Dream was the fourth studio album from British band Silver Sun  The album was first released in Japan, where the band has steadily built a large fan base.  Unlike its predecessor Disappear Here, the album was recorded by the whole band, though drummer Richard Sayce is only credited with backing vocals as Programmed Drums were used.

The album was remixed for the UK version of the album where it was released on 4 December 2006.  Track One, Fallen, was remixed by producer Nigel Godrich, his first involvement with the band since their debut album Silver Sun.


Track listing
"Fallen" – 2:04
"Sunday Gurl" – 3:20
"Facts of Life" – 3:11
"Find Him and Love Him" – 2:55
"Hi Scorpia" – 2:32
"Rock and Roll Widow" – 2:58
"See me in my Dreams" – 2:14
"That's Just What She Wants" – 3:18
"Sweet Lucy" – 2:33
"Getting it Together in the Country" – 2:28
"Poppin" – 3:37
"You Can Love" – 2:42
"Dad's Weird Dream" – 3:54

Personnel
James Broad - lead vocals, guitar, saxophone
Paul Smith - guitar
Richard Kane - bass, piano, vocals
Richard Sayce - vocals

References

Albums produced by Nigel Godrich
Silver Sun albums
2006 albums